Terzian sometimes also Terziyan and Terzyan, common Armenian surname.

It may refer to:

Terzian
Alain Terzian (born 1949), French-Armenian film producer
Alexandros Terzian (born 1968), Argentine-Greek sprinter
Alicia Terzian (born 1934), Argentine Armenian conductor, musicologist and composer
Armen Terzian (1915—1989), American football official in the NFL
Grace Paine Terzian (born 1952), chief communications officer of MediaDC publishers
Hagop Terzian (1879–1915), Ottoman Armenian writer and pharmacist
Kristi Terzian (born 1967), American former alpine skier
Philip Terzian (born 1950), American journalist
Tovmas Terzian (1840–1909), famed Ottoman Armenian poet, playwright, and professor
Yervant Terzian (1939-2019), American astronomer

Terziyan
Nubar Terziyan (1909–1994), born Nubar Alyanak, Turkish Armenian actor

Armenian-language surnames